Punchinello may refer to:

Punchinello, an American satirical magazine
Pulcinella, the commedia character, and its English descendant, Punch
Punchinello Players – Student theater at the University of Minnesota, St.Paul Campus for 80 years (1914 – 1994).
The third main boss in the SNES video game Super Mario RPG
The main character in Max Lucado's 1997 book, You Are Special and subsequent books about Lucado's fictional society of wooden people called the "Wemmicks"
The Punchinello crime family and its leader, Don Angelo Punchinello, the main antagonists for the first couple of chapters of the video game Max Payne
A clown marionette seen in "Grandpa's Magical Toys" (1988), a video in the Wee Sing video series (played by Joel Morello) and "Wee Singdom" (1996), a video in the Wee Sing video series (played by Thom Rivera replacing the 1988 departed Joel Morello for/from playing Punchinello the Clown)
Zemeros flegyas or Punchinello, a species of butterfly of South Asia